Antonio Vivaldi wrote a set of twelve sonatas for violin and basso continuo, Op. 2, in 1709. First published by Antonio Bortoli in Venice in 1709 (in movable type), the collection was later reprinted by Estienne Roger (who became Vivaldi's main publisher) in Amsterdam around 1712/13.

Sonata No. 1 in G minor, RV 27
Sonata No. 2 in A major, RV 31
Sonata No. 3 in D minor, RV 14
Sonata No. 4 in F major, RV 20
Sonata No. 5 in B minor, RV 36
Sonata No. 6 in C major, RV 1
Sonata No. 7 in C minor, RV 8
Sonata No. 8 in G major, RV 23
Sonata No. 9 in E minor, RV 16
Sonata No. 10 in F minor, RV 21
Sonata No. 11 in D major, RV 9
Sonata No. 12 in A minor, RV 32

References

External links

Compositions by Antonio Vivaldi
1709 compositions